Charles Mersch (17 January 1908 – 29 January 1996) was a Luxembourgian water polo player. He competed in the men's tournament at the 1928 Summer Olympics.

References

1908 births
1996 deaths
Luxembourgian male water polo players
Olympic water polo players of Luxembourg
Water polo players at the 1928 Summer Olympics
Sportspeople from Luxembourg City